IBC Tamil (The International Broadcasting Corporation for Tamil) is a mass media company offering 24-hour television, radio and online services to the Sri Lankan Tamil diaspora. Headquartered in London, the company is licensed and regulated under European media law.

In 2015, the company announced that it invested £2 million in state-of-the-art digital studio equipment. The channel now produces nearly all its video content in High Definition (HD) through its studios in UK, India & Sri Lanka. IBC Tamil is available on several third party DTH satellite and OTT platforms around the world such as Asian Television Network, YuppTV and YouTube

Lately in 2021, IBC Tamil is rebranded fully as International Broadcasting Corporation Limited (IBC) in London and appointed Aninda Bhowmik as its Chief Executive Officer.

History 
IBC Tamil was launched as a radio station in London in 1997. Since then, the media institution has operated under different organizations. From 2014 onwards, it is owned and run by London Tamil Media Ltd who, in April 2015, expanded the organization to include the television channel as well as a revamped news website updated round the clock.

IBC Tamil Television 
IBC Tamil Television was launched in April 2015 at a ceremonial event in London. Over 1500 people including prominent media personnel, celebrities and leading artists in the Tamil community attended the launch.

TV shows – current affairs and infotainment

IBC Tamil News 

 Vanakkam Thamil 
 Puthu Velichcham 
 Gnayiru Vanakkam
 Unmayin Tharisanam
 Yaathum Oore
 Eela Thamilarum Sarvathesa Arasiyalum
Ilavarasi
 Muranum Mudivum
 Vanakkam Thaainaadu
 Agam Puram
 Sarvathesa Pulanayvu
 Oorodu Uravaada
 Dineshin thedal
 Varthaga Nooku
 Airoppiya Neram
 France Neram
 Kaalakkuri

TV shows – Game shows and entertainment 

 Nadana Raajas
 Thangakural thedal
 Paattukku Paattu
 Thamilukku thangam
 Short film express
 Kaasu mela
 Vanna Chittukkal
 Anthi Varum Neram (5 shows a week)
 Nadanthathu ennannaa
 Thiraikku pinnal
 Aaniye Pudunga Venam
 Kollywood Pakkam
 Vaadaa malar
 Ithaya Veenai 
 Top 10 songs
 Nilavai Pidippom (Kids Show)
Marma Kuzhal
Patthodu Pathinondu
Vilayadukalam
The Lasya's Vrindrani Awards

IBC Tamil Radio 
Established in 1997, IBC Tamil radio is considered the largest and most popular radio station the Tamil diaspora. Its core audience is estimated to be over one million.

IBC Tamil News website 
Ibctamil.com is a news website updated round the clock. The website covers all prominent events in World Affairs with a focus on Sri Lanka and South India. This website is ranked top 100 websites in Sri Lanka.

Notable people 
 Janany Kunaseelan - Sri Lankan Tamil television anchor and actress. She appeared in Star Tamil TV as a television anchor for cooking shows and as an actress for comedy shows like Dak Dik Dos on IBC Tamil. In 2022, She participated in Bigg Boss Tamil 6. She was evicted on the 70th day. She is set to make her Tamil cinema debut in the highly anticipated film tentatively titled Thalapathy 67 directed by Lokesh Kanagaraj and starring Vijay.

References

External links
Official Website
Radio Website
TV Website 
News Website 

British Indian mass media